Robert "Cowboy" Cowie (born November 3, 1967) is a Canadian former professional ice hockey defenceman. He played 78 games in the National Hockey League with the Los Angeles Kings during the 1994–95 and 1995–96 seasons. The rest of his career, which lasted from 1991 to 2004, was spent in the minor leagues and then in various European leagues.

College career
Cowie was born in Willowdale, Ontario. As a youth, he played in the 1980 Quebec International Pee-Wee Hockey Tournament with a minor ice hockey team from Goulding Park in Toronto. He was a four-year letterman  for the Northeastern University Huskies between 1988 and 1991, scoring over 40 points each of his sophomore, junior and senior seasons.  He finished his college career with 46 goals and 96 assists for 142 points in 139 games, and is the second leading scorer and fourteenth leading overall scorer in school history. He was named an All-Hockey East All-Star in 1988, 1989 and 1990, and was named an All-American in 1990.

Professional career
After his college career ended, Cowie signed with the Winnipeg Jets and was assigned to their Moncton Hawks farm team in the American Hockey League.  He quickly established himself as an offensive defenseman in the minors, never scoring less than 11 goals in a full season for the whole of his minor league career.  His best season as a pro came in the final season for the storied Springfield Indians in 1994, when as an assistant captain for the club he scored 17 goals and 57 assists for 74 points and was named a First Team All-Star on defense.

Following that season, Cowie signed with the Los Angeles Kings, and saw his first NHL action in 1995, splitting the 1995 and 1996 seasons between Los Angeles and the Kings' minor league affiliate, the Phoenix Roadrunners. Cowie's first NHL goal was assisted by his Kings teammate Wayne Gretzky.

After the 1996 season, Cowie spent the rest of his playing career in Europe, most notably with Eisbären Berlin, for whom he played four seasons between 1998 and 2002.  He retired after the 2004 season when he played in the Italian team Milano Vipers.

Cowie's National Hockey League totals were 7 goals and 12 assists for 19 points in 72 games.

Post-professional career
Since retiring as a player, Cowie has remained active in the sport as a scout, first part-time for the New York Islanders and then as a full-time pro scout for the Toronto Maple Leafs. He is also a founder of Athletes Resource, a sports services organization. The company hosts an annual hockey prospects tournament and professional conditioning camps attended by players from the NHL and other professional leagues. In the private sector, Rob formed The Muskoka Group, a Real Estate group he runs in Scottsdale Arizona in conjunction with Prudential AZ Properties. Rob has won the Chairman's Circle Gold award, indicative of the top, for 2008, 2009, and 2010.

Career statistics

Regular season and playoffs

Awards and honors

 Cowie was inducted into the Northeastern University Hall of Fame in 2005.

References

External links
 
Athletes Resource site

1967 births
Living people
AHCA Division I men's ice hockey All-Americans
Canadian ice hockey defencemen
Eisbären Berlin players
EV Zug players
HC La Chaux-de-Fonds players
HC Milano players
Jokerit players
Los Angeles Kings players
Moncton Hawks players
New York Islanders scouts
People from Willowdale, Toronto
Phoenix Roadrunners (IHL) players
St. Michael's Buzzers players
SC Riessersee players
Sportspeople from North York
Ice hockey people from Toronto
Springfield Indians players
Toronto Maple Leafs scouts
Undrafted National Hockey League players